General elections were held in Liechtenstein in April and May 1875. Six of the seats in the Landtag were indirectly elected by electors selected by voters.

Electors 
Electors were selected through elections that were held between 26 and 30 April. Each municipality had two electors for every 100 inhabitants.

Results 
The electors met on 8 May in Vaduz to elect six Landtag members and five substitute members. The Landtag members and their substitutes were elected in three ballots. Of the 160 electors, 156 participated in the voting.

Ferdinand Walser declined his election. Markus Kessler declined to take his seat in the Landtag following the election and was replaced by Josef Anton Amann.

References 

Liechtenstein
1875 in Liechtenstein
Elections in Liechtenstein
May 1875 events